Athrips ravida is a moth of the family Gelechiidae. It is found in China (Ningxia).

The wingspan is 15–18 mm. The forewings are covered with grey, black-tipped scales. There are paired and sometimes fused indistinct black points near the base, two black spots at one-third and two smaller black spots at two-thirds. The hindwings are light grey. Adults are on wing from June to August.

Etymology
The species name refers to the wing pattern and is derived from Latin ravidus (meaning grey).

References

Moths described in 2009
Athrips
Moths of Asia